Prasad Kumar Harichandan  also known as Prasad Harichandan (born: 12 May 1964) is an Oriya politician and the former president of Odisha Pradesh Congress Committee.

He was born on 12 May 1964 at Nanakera, in Puri district, Odisha. He was elected to the Eleventh, Twelfth and Fourteenth Odisha Legislative Assembly.
He was the youngest Minister of State in 1999 and held Home, Science, Technology and Culture departments.
He was the Chief Whip of the Congress Legislature Party in 14th Assembly from 2009 to 2014.

References

1964 births
Living people
People from Puri district
State cabinet ministers of Odisha
Indian National Congress politicians
Indian National Congress politicians from Odisha